Laurence de Grandhomme (22 November 1956 – 13 December 2017) was a Zimbabwean cricketer. He played sixteen first-class and eight List A matches for Zimbabwe between 1979 and 1989. His son, Colin, plays international cricket for New Zealand.

References

External links
 

1956 births
2017 deaths
Zimbabwean cricketers
People from Ndola
White Zimbabwean people